Hranice Abyss is the deepest flooded pit cave in the world. It is a karst sinkhole near the town of Hranice, Czech Republic. In 2020, a scientific expedition to the cave revealed that part of the system apparently reaches 1 kilometre deep, albeit with the lowest reaches sediment-filled. Analysis of the water found carbon and helium isotopes which implied that the cave has been formed by acidic waters, heated by the mantle, welling up from below.

Description 
It is located near the Zbrašov Aragonite Caves, which are open to the public. The total depth of the abyss (at least 473.5 m) is unknown, as the lower part of the abyss is flooded by the Hranice Lake. The abyss has an elliptical shape and is situated in the SE-SW direction. It is approximately 110 metres long at its longest point and 50 metres wide at its widest point. For most visitors the most interesting figure is the depth of the abyss including the flooded part, but in reality it is a rather rugged karst system. Karst phenomena (e.g. sinkholes) can also be observed in the immediate vicinity of the abyss. At a depth of 48 metres below the surface of the lake, after crossing the Zubatice siphon, it is possible to ascend to the dry caves (Rotunda Dry, Heaven I-III, Monika). These are continuously monitored, including water and air temperature measurements. In addition, the Dry Rotunda is known as a roosting site for bats, which enter it through a very narrow passage from the Jezírka area. They have to cross about 7 metres of rock mass. The occurrence of bats is monitored and studied by experts from the Institute of Biology of the Academy of Sciences of the Czech Republic.

Depth 
The dry part of the abyss is 69.5 m deep. There is a small lake at the bottom. Below the surface, the abyss was mapped to a depth of -170 m (Pavel Říha, 2005), followed by a dive to a depth of -181 m (Starnawski, 2000) and a 21 June 2012 dive to a depth of -217 m (Starnawski with a team of six Czech and Polish divers). Robot (R.O.V.) Hyball was at a depth of -205 m (1995). The bottom was not reached because further investigations revealed a configuration of topography preventing further progress of the robot.

The measurement of the depth of the abyss was made on 1 October 2012, when Krzysztof Starnawski launched a probe from a depth of 217 meters to a depth of 373 meters during a caving action from the organization ZO ČSS 7-02 Hranický kras Olomouc. He then briefly descended to a depth of 225 meters himself, which is the deepest depth reached by a diver in this location.

On 12 October 2014, Krzysztof Starnawski again measured the new maximum depth of the submerged part of the Granicka Abyss – 384 meters. On 27 September 2016, the ROV made by GRALmarine reached a depth of 404 meters without reaching the bottom. This surpassed the depth of Italy's Pozzo del Merro, which until then had been considered the deepest submerged chasm in the world with a maximum measured depth of 392 meters.

The total confirmed depth of the dry and wet parts was 519.5 metres (69.5+450) by 2022. It is estimated that the depth of the abyss could be between 800 and 1200 metres, as indicated by the temperature and chemical composition of the water. This is confirmed by other studies published in the scientific press in 2022.

From a historical perspective, it is interesting to read the report of Jiří Pogoda that he launched a specially designed probe (glider) from Zubatić to a total depth of 260 metres on 13 April 1980, during a solitary dive, without reaching the bottom. However, his measurements are incomplete and considered unreliable, as they have not been further verified. In terms of current knowledge, Pogodov's measurements are true, but due to the opaque limitation at a depth of 205 metres, it would have to be a huge accident for his probe to sink lower and, more importantly, to be able to pull it back through a tangle of logs, branches and other obstacles in the terrain.

References

External links

Propast 373m depth of new pit

Sinkholes of the Czech Republic
Přerov District
Caves of the Czech Republic